David Hayes (born May 15, 1963 in Framingham, Massachusetts) is an American conductor.

Hayes was educated at the University of Hartford, Hartt School of Music (BM cum laude, musicology) and the Curtis Institute of Music (Diploma in Orchestral Conducting) where his teacher was Otto-Werner Mueller.  In addition, he studied viola with Richard Rusack at Hartt and conducting with Charles Bruck at the Pierre Monteux School in Hancock, ME.

David Hayes serves on the Board of Directors of Chorus America, the national service organization for choruses.

He is currently Music Director of the New York Choral Society, Director of Orchestral and Conducting Studies at Mannes College The New School for Music in New York, Staff Conductor of the Curtis Institute of Music in Philadelphia and a member of the conducting staff of the Philadelphia Orchestra having been appointed by Wolfgang Sawallisch.  In addition to his other duties, he served as Artistic Advisor to The Washington Chorus during the 2007-2008 season. He was previously Music Director of The Philadelphia Singers, a professional chorus, until they were dissolved in 2015. With the New York Choral Society, Hayes has conducted New York and world premieres including works by Jennifer Higdon, James MacMillan and Joseph Vella. With The Philadelphia Singers, Hayes conducted numerous Philadelphia and World Premieres including works of Jennifer Higdon, Ezra Laderman, Robert Capanna, Thomas Whitman and Morton Feldman.

David Hayes is a conductor with an unusually broad range of repertoire, spanning the symphonic, oratorio/choral, and operatic genres.  He has made his Philadelphia Orchestra conducting debut in May, 2003 sharing a program with Wolfgang Sawallisch.  He has made conducting appearances with the Philadelphia Orchestra, Richmond Symphony Orchestra, Springfield (MA) Symphony, Lancaster (PA) Symphony, Louisiana Philharmonic, Warsaw Philharmonic, Chamber Orchestra of Philadelphia, Curtis Symphony Orchestra, Mannes Orchestra, Rutgers Orchestra, Relâche Ensemble, Los Angeles Master Chorale, The Washington Chorus, Mendelssohn Choir of Pittsburgh, Berkshire Choral Festival, Curtis Opera Theatre and the European Center for Opera and Voice (ECOV) in Belgium and Prague.  He made his debut at the Verbier Festival in 1999 with a concert featuring percussionist Evelyn Glennie.

He has assisted and prepared orchestras for many of the world's leading conductors including Wolfgang Sawallisch, Kurt Masur, Christoph Eschenbach, Sir André Previn, Sir Simon Rattle, Charles Dutoit, Yuri Temirkanov, David Zinman, Leonard Slatkin, Sir Roger Norrington, Raphael Frühbeck de Burgos and Mstislav Rostropovich.  He served as Assistant Conductor to Sir André Previn for the Curtis Symphony Orchestra's 1999 European Tour with Anne-Sophie Mutter and served as cover conductor for Kurt Masur with the New York Philharmonic.

Chorally, he has prepared ensembles for Wolfgang Sawallisch, Kurt Masur, Charles Dutoit, Christoph Eschenbach, James Levine, Sir Andrew Davis, Nicholas McGegan, Sir Simon Rattle, Yuri Temirkanov, Jeffrey Tate, Raphael Frühbeck de Burgos and Neeme Järvi.

References

American choral conductors
American male conductors (music)
1963 births
Living people
University of Hartford Hartt School alumni
Curtis Institute of Music alumni
21st-century American conductors (music)
21st-century American male musicians